Zeynabad or Zein Abad or Zainabad or Zinabad or Zin Abad may refer to:

Zeynabad, Ardabil
Zeynabad, East Azerbaijan
Zeynabad, Darab, Fars Province
Zeynabad, Qaryah ol Kheyr, Darab County, Fars Province
Zeynabad, Qir and Karzin, Fars Province
Zeynabad, Efzal, Qir and Karzin County, Fars Province
Zeynabad, Kharameh, Fars Province
Zeynabad, Golestan
Zinabad, Hamadan
Zeynabad, Kerman
Zeynabad, Rafsanjan, Kerman Province
Zinabad, Khuzestan
Zeynabad, Qazvin
Zeynabad, Razavi Khorasan
Zeynabad, Boshruyeh, South Khorasan Province
Zeynabad, Nehbandan, South Khorasan Province
Zeynabad, Khatam, Yazd Province
Zeynabad, Taft, Yazd Province
Zeynabad Rural District, in Qazvin Province